Pazo de Raxoi ('Palace of Raxoi ') is a neoclassical palace in Santiago de Compostela, Galicia, Spain. Completed in 1766, it is located on the Praza do Obradoiro, in front of the cathedral.

It is the seat of the city council and regional government.

References

Palaces in Galicia (Spain)
Buildings and structures in Santiago de Compostela
Houses completed in 1766
Neoclassical architecture in Galicia (Spain)
City and town halls in Spain